The enzyme myrcene synthase (EC 4.2.3.15) catalyzes the chemical reaction

geranyl diphosphate  myrcene + diphosphate

This enzyme belongs to the family of lyases, specifically those carbon-oxygen lyases acting on phosphates.  The systematic name of this enzyme class is geranyl-diphosphate diphosphate-lyase (myrcene-forming). This enzyme participates in monoterpenoid biosynthesis.

References

 

EC 4.2.3
Enzymes of unknown structure